Salegentibacter sediminis is a Gram-negative, aerobic, rod-shaped and non-motile bacterium from the genus of Salegentibacter which has been isolated from sediment obtained from the coast of Weihai.

References

Flavobacteria
Bacteria described in 2018